Clistothyris is a genus of moths in the family Gelechiidae. It contains the species Clistothyris villosula, which is found in Colombia.

References

Gelechiinae